Lee Township is one of twenty-six townships in Fulton County, Illinois, USA.  As of the 2010 census, its population was 237 and it contained 110 housing units.

Geography

Unincorporated towns
 Babylon
 Checkrow
 Manley
(This list is based on USGS data and may include former settlements.)

Extinct towns
 Virgil
 Oak Grove

Cemeteries
The township contains these six cemeteries: Barnes, Checkrow, Guernsey, Peirsol, Rigdon and Virgil.

Peirsol Cemetery was a family cemetery which many at one time scattered the county. Like many it was abandoned & is in poor condition if not destroyed.

Guernsey Cemetery is a cemetery off route 9,it too is in very poor condition & overgrown with brush.

Major highways
  Illinois Route 9
  Illinois Route 41

Demographics

School districts
 Avon Community Unit School District 176
 Bushnell Prairie City Community Unit School District 170
 Spoon River Valley Community Unit School District 4

Political districts
 Illinois's 17th congressional district
 State House District 94
 State Senate District 47

References
 
 United States Census Bureau 2007 TIGER/Line Shapefiles
 United States National Atlas

External links
 City-Data.com
 Illinois State Archives

Townships in Fulton County, Illinois
Townships in Illinois